This is a list of hillforts of Monmouthshire that have been registered with Cadw as historical monuments. Welsh names are in brackets.

See also
List of hill forts in Wales
List of Scheduled Monuments in Monmouthshire

References

Archaeological sites in Monmouthshire
 Hillforts
Monmouthshire
Lists of hillforts of Wales